BBC Newsline is the BBC's national television news programme for Northern Ireland, broadcast on BBC One Northern Ireland from the headquarters of BBC Northern Ireland in Ormeau Avenue, Belfast.

As well as being available via all multi-channel outlets in Northern Ireland (including via Sky channel 101), the programme can be accessed by the rest of the United Kingdom (along with all other regional BBC news programmes) on the BBC iPlayer, or alternatively on Sky channel 973. Viewers from the Republic of Ireland with a Sky subscription can also watch on Sky channel 141. As the BBC UK regional TV on satellite service is broadcast unencrypted, it is possible to receive BBC Newsline anywhere in Europe using an appropriate receiver.

Programme history
BBC Newsline is the most recent incarnation of BBC Northern Ireland's television news service, which began on Monday 30 September 1957 as part of the corporation's rollout of regional television services. The first five-minute bulletins, Today in Northern Ireland, were presented by Maurice Shillington and broadcast from a tiny radio studio within Broadcasting House in Belfast.

Up until the launch of Today in Northern Ireland, a networked topical magazine programme, Ulster Mirror, had been broadcast every fortnight since Friday 26 November 1954. The new daily bulletins were later expanded to ten minutes and supplemented by a magazine programme called Studio Eight, first broadcast on Friday 20 February 1959 with Robert Coulter as its presenter. Today in Northern Ireland was replaced on 17 September 1962 by a 20-minute programme initially known as Six O'Clock. The new longer magazine programmes changed title to Six Five and Six Ten until Scene Around Six was introduced in January 1968.

Main presenters during the programme's history included Larry McCoubrey, Barry Cowan and Sean Rafferty. The launch of the national Six O'Clock News led to Scene Around Six being relaunched as Inside Ulster in September 1984. On Tuesday 7 May 1985, the programme was moved to an earlier timeslot of 5.35pm.

The current BBC Newsline brand was introduced on 12 February 1996 when the main evening programme returned to a 6.30pm timeslot. Although Noel Thompson and Lynda Bryans were the original choice of presenters, Thompson was later dropped causing Bryans to resign and move to UTV. The programme's first presenters were political editor Jim Dougal and reporter Yvette Shapiro. Dougal was replaced as anchor by Conor Bradford after two months.
 BBC Newsline also introduced teletext subtitles for deaf viewers upon its launch.

Noel Thompson and Donna Traynor became the programme's main anchors until August 2012, when Thompson left to join BBC Radio Ulster. BBC Newsline is now presented by a single main anchor

In November 2021, Traynor had resigned from BBC Northern Ireland after 33 years, amid legal proceedings.

The following month, it was announced that Tara Mills and Declan Harvey will alternate as main anchors of BBC Newsline and the BBC Radio Ulster drivetime news programme, Evening Extra. Harvey joined the programme in early 2022.

It has the longest-running titles and music, and also having launched on 21 April 2008.

Notable presenters and reporters
 Tara Mills (Main anchor)
Declan Harvey (Main anchor)
 Tina Campbell (Newsreader)
Kerry Thompson (Newsreader)
 Jo Scott (Newsreader)
Catherine Morrison (reporter, relief presenter)
Linzi Lima (Newsreader, weather) 
 Enda McClafferty(Political Editor)
 John Campbell (Business & Economics Editor)
 Marie-Louise Connolly (Health Correspondent)
 Robbie Meredith (Education & Arts Correspondent)
 Julian O’Neill (Home Affairs Correspondent)
 Louise Cullen (Agriculture & Environment Correspondent)
 Clodagh Rice (Business Correspondent)
 Mark Simpson, Correspondent
 Sara Girvan, Correspondent
 Stephen Walker (Politics)
 Gareth Gordon (Politics)
 Jayne McCormack (Politics)
Cormac Campbell (South East district reporter)
Kieron Tourish (North West district reporter)
Julian Fowler (South West district reporter)
Maria McCann (North East district reporter)
Will Leitch
Helen Jones
Julie McCullough
Ita Dungan
Gordon Adair
Dan Stanton
Michael Fitzpatrick (reporter, newsreader)
Kelly Bonner
Sara Neill (reporter, newsreader)
Richard Morgan
Aileen Moynagh
Rick Faragher (reporter, newsreader)
Eve Rosato
Angie Phillips (weather)
 Barra Best (weather)
 Cecilia Daly (weather)
 Geoff Maskell (weather)
 Stephen Watson (sport)
 Thomas Niblock (sport)
 Gavin Andrews (sport)
Nicola McCarthy (sport)
Paula Clarke (signer)
Adam McCormick (signer)
Holly Lane (signer)
Richard Beattie (signer)

Previous notable presenters & reporters
 Raymond Abernathy (sign language interpreter)
 Jim Fitzpatrick
Karen Patterson
 Jackie Fullerton
 David Maxwell
 Rose Neill
Yvette Shapiro
Jim Dougal
 Austin O'Callaghan
 Maggie Taggart
 Donna Traynor
 Sarah Travers
Noel Thompson
Conor Bradford

References

External links

1996 British television series debuts
2000s British television series
2010s British television series
2020s British television series
1990s television series from Northern Ireland
2000s television series from Northern Ireland
2010s television series from Northern Ireland
2020s television series from Northern Ireland
BBC Northern Ireland television shows
BBC Regional News shows
Irish television news shows
Television news in Northern Ireland